Jeanine Rueff (5 February 1922 – c. September 1999) was a French composer and music educator.

Biography
Rueff was born in Paris and studied at the Conservatoire de Paris with Tony Aubin, Henri Challan, Jean and Noël Gallon, and Henri Busser. In 1948 she won second place in the Grand Prix de Rome with Odette Gartenlaub.

Rueff worked from 1950 as an assistant in the saxophone class of Marcel Mule and in the clarinet class of Ulysse Delecluse at the Conservatoire de Paris. In 1960 she became a teacher there for Solfège sight singing, and from 1977 to 1988 she taught harmony. Her most famous pupil was Jean-Michel Jarre. In 1945 Rueff received the Prix Favareille-Chailley-Richez for a jazz piano quintet. She also composed the chamber opera Le Femme d'Enée (1954), a concerto for four saxophones and a Symphonietta (1956).

The ensemble Saxallegro (with Hannes Kawrza, saxophone, and Florian Pagitsch, organ) recorded her 1997 Chanson et Passepied together with works by Eugène Bozza, Pierre Max Dubois, and Jacques Ibert and the recording was issued on a CD. In 1999 she provided concert pieces for bass trombone in the program of the Concours International de Trombone in Guebwiller.

Rueff was buried on 22 September 1999, and the saxophone quartet Ledieu 2000 gave a concert in her memory.

Works
Rueff wrote extensively for saxophone, saxhorn, euphonium, baritone horn, clarinet and cornet, and her compositions for saxophone are often used as required contest solos.

References

1922 births
1999 deaths
French music educators
French classical composers
French women classical composers
20th-century classical composers
20th-century French women musicians
20th-century French composers
Women music educators
20th-century women composers